Christopher Taylor is a prominent American pianist.

Taylor graduated from Harvard College, and has performed with the National Symphony Orchestra, the Fort Worth Symphony Orchestra, the Atlanta Symphony Orchestra, the New York Philharmonic, the Los Angeles Philharmonic and the Buffalo Philharmonic, among others. He has received an Avery Fisher Career Grant, the Classical Fellowship of the American Pianists Association and the Gilmore Young Artist Award and earned a bronze medal at the Van Cliburn International Piano Competition in 1993. 

Taylor lives in Middleton, Wisconsin, with his wife and two daughters, and has been a professor of piano at the University of Wisconsin–Madison since 2000.

References

 Christopher Taylor's bio at the University of Wisconsin—Madison site
 LA Times Review of Taylor retrieved 24th Nov 2010
 On Wisconsin Magazine feature

Year of birth missing (living people)
Living people
American classical pianists
Male classical pianists
American male pianists
Harvard College alumni
University of Wisconsin–Madison faculty
Prize-winners of the Van Cliburn International Piano Competition
21st-century classical pianists
21st-century American male musicians
21st-century American pianists